Sathianathan is a surname. Notable people with the surname include:

B. Sathianathan (born 1958), Malaysian football coach and former player
Ramya Sathianathan, Indian engineer and founder of Ramya Sathianathan Polytechnic and B.Ed College